Aleksandr Nikolayevich Alkhazov (born 27 May 1984) is a Russian professional football player of Assyrian ethnic origin. He plays for FC Khimki.

Career
He made his debut in the Russian Premier League in 2003 for FC Rostov.

Alkhazov left FC Okzhetpes by mutual consent on 21 June 2016.

References

1984 births
Sportspeople from Krasnodar Krai
People from Kurganinsky District
Living people
Russian footballers
Russia under-21 international footballers
FC Rostov players
FC KAMAZ Naberezhnye Chelny players
FC Zvezda Irkutsk players
Russian Premier League players
PFC Krylia Sovetov Samara players
FC Spartak Vladikavkaz players
FC Luch Vladivostok players
FC Shinnik Yaroslavl players
FC Volgar Astrakhan players
Russian expatriate footballers
Russian people of Assyrian descent
Expatriate footballers in Kazakhstan
FC Okzhetpes players
FC Mordovia Saransk players
FC Fakel Voronezh players
Association football forwards
FC Olimp-Dolgoprudny players
FC Spartak Nizhny Novgorod players
FC Khimki players